VentureCrowd is an Australian multi asset class crowdfunding platform, headquartered in Sydney, including equity crowdfunding, property crowdfunding and debt-based crowdfunding. VentureCrowd completed the largest Australian equity crowdfunding raise, $4.2 million, for taxi-booking and payment software company Ingogo in May 2015. This deal is ranked 8th on the List of highest funded equity crowdfunding projects. This deal is ranked 8th on the List of highest funded equity crowdfunding projects. In June 2016, VentureCrowd raised more than $900,000 for a Western Sydney residential project - a 35-lot development in Riverstone East, in partnership with the property developer ClearState. In August 2016, a second project raised $1,700,000 for a 44-lot development project in Austral.

History
VentureCrowd was founded in October 2013 in Sydney by Australian alternative investment management company Artesian. VentureCrowd launched its first startup equity crowdfunding deals in October 2014. and property crowdfunding deals in partnership with Mirvac in April 2015.

Equity Crowdfunding in Australia
Currently Australia does not allow equity crowdfunding for the general public but only for wholesale (sophisticated) investors (whom are defined as investors holding net assets in the amount of $2.5M or achieve a gross income of $250,000 in the last 2 financial years).

The Australian federal government's now dissolved Corporations and Markets Advisory Committee (CAMAC) released its report on equity crowdfunding in May 2014. The report proposed a regulatory regime specifically designed for and to facilitate crowd sourced equity funding (CSEF) in Australia. The CAMAC report recommended Australia introduce legislation allowing retail investors to invest up to $10,000 a year in start-ups via equity crowdfunding, with a maximum of $2,500 in each company. It suggested companies be allowed to raise up to $2 million per year on such platforms.

In the 2015 Federal Budget, as part of its small business package, the government announced that it would make it easier for small businesses to access capital by allowing crowd-sourced equity funding and by simplifying related reporting and disclosure requirements. Although details on the specific model have not yet been released, Treasury has set aside $7.8 million in funding over four years to enable the Australian Securities and Investments Commission (ASIC) to implement and monitor the regulatory framework to facilitate the use of crowd-sourced equity funding when it is unveiled before the end of 2015.

See also

 Comparison of crowdfunding services
 Pozible
 Birchal

References

External links
 

Financial services companies established in 2013
Social economy in Australia
Equity crowdfunding platforms
Companies based in Sydney
Australian companies established in 2013
Privately held companies of Australia
Online financial services companies of Australia
Investment companies of Australia
2013 establishments in Australia